Souleymane Touré (born 25 June 1980) is a Guinean politician who represents the constituency of Forécariah, in the National Assembly (Guinea). He is a member of the Majority Rally of the Guinean People Party of former president Alpha Conde.

Biography 
He received his medical degree from Gamal Abdel Nasser University of Conakry in 2010, specializing in gunshot wounds at the Trauma care center at Donka Hospital. In 2012, he attended a resident training program on triage at the SAMU (Urgent Medical Aid Service) in Toulouse. He then returned and began working at the Clinique Abroise Paré, first as the doctor for the Simfer mining project site, and then as the medical coordinator for mining sites. In 2011, he conducted environmental impact studies for the Simfer mining project in Simandou with SNC-Lavalin. In 2014, he became the referral physician for SIMFER, and in 2015 for the European Union election observation mission in Guinea. In 2016, he founded his own clinic, First Aid Action Guinée (FAAG).

References

External links 
 https://www.cliniqueambroisepare.com/

Members of the National Assembly (Guinea)
Living people
Gamal Abdel Nasser University of Conakry alumni
1980 births